Hester M. Poole (Hunt; May 27, 1833/34 – 1932) was an American writer, poet, art critic, artist, and an advocate for women's rights.

Early life and education
Hester Martha Hunt was born in Georgia, Vermont, May 27, 1834, or 1833. She was the eighth child of Harry and Mary Staples Hunt, who were emigres from Connecticut to Vermont. The Hunts traced back their ancestry two hundred years, and were of Irish, Scotch and English descent. Harry Hunt, her father, was a soldier in the War of 1812 and 1814, and was a participant in the Battle of Plattsburgh. She was graduated from Castleton Seminary (now Castleton University), at an early age, afterward continuing her studies at Burlington, Vermont. At an early age, she wrote poems and stories, which were often published.

Career
Prostrated from overwork, she went south for her health and engaged in teaching for several years in the states of Mississippi and Tennessee.

After marrying C. O. Poole of New York City on January 14, 1865, Poole became occupied with domestic life. In 1868, the Pooles went abroad, where they traveled, during several months, in Great Britain and on the Continent. During these travels, Poole contributed a series of letters to a daily paper of New York from Edinburgh, London, Paris, Rome, Naples, and Geneva.

Interrupted for some time by domestic duties, her contributions were resumed in the Continent and Manhattan magazines. Those consisted chiefly of illustrated articles upon decorative arts, and were followed in various publications by a large number of critical and descriptive essays upon those and similar topics. Her series of articles applied to the house appeared in the Home Maker, another in Good Housekeeping, and a large number of her illustrated articles appeared from time to time in the Decorator and Furnisher of New York. In them, there were schemes for house decoration, which were widely copied. Another series, "From Attic to Cellar", was furnished to the Home Magazine, and a still longer series, "The Philosophy of Living", was contributed by Poole to Good Housekeeping.  She also wrote many unsigned articles, including editorials, art and book criticisms, as well as essays.

In addition to her fondness for art, Poole also studied literary, ethical, and reformatory subjects. Upon one or another of those topics, she frequently gave conversations or lectures in drawing rooms in those fields. Her articles were published in the Chautauquan, the Arena, the Union Signal, the Ladies' Home Journal and many other publications. During several years, she edited a column upon "Woman and the Household" in a weekly newspaper, and also wrote editorials for journals on ethics and reform. Her last book, entitled Fruits and How to Use Them (New York, 1891), was unique -it contained nearly 700 recipes for the preparation of fruits- and attained a large circulation. As a poet, Poole's contributions were less frequent. Some of her verses were included in Harper's Encyclopaedia of Poetry, edited by Epes Sargent.

Poole served as an officer of Sorosis, and furnished a "History of Sorosis" for the Woman's Library Building of the World's Columbian Exposition. She was also a member of the New York Woman's Press Club.

Personal life
She made her home in Metuchen, New Jersey. Poole died in 1932.

Selected works

References

Attribution

Bibliography

External links
 
 

1830s births
1932 deaths
19th-century American women writers
19th-century American poets
19th-century American artists
People from Georgia, Vermont
American critics
American cookbook writers
Women cookbook writers
American travel writers
American women poets
Writers from Vermont
American women artists
Artists from Vermont
American art critics
American women's rights activists
Castleton University people
American women travel writers
Wikipedia articles incorporating text from A Woman of the Century